Chandler Duke Cox (born July 29, 1996) is a former American football fullback. He played college football at Auburn.

College career
After playing in a single-wing offense at Apopka High School and leading the team to a state championship, Cox committed to Auburn on June 1, 2014. He played offense and special teams for Auburn. On offense, he was utilized as a blocking and receiving fullback, taking few carries over the course of his college career. He was a hybrid player that spent time at the tight end, wide receiver, halfback, Upback and wildcat quarterback positions.

Professional career
Cox was selected by the Miami Dolphins in the seventh round (233rd overall) of the 2019 NFL Draft. He made the opening roster after embracing being a blocker. On January 2, 2021, Cox was waived by the Dolphins.

Personal life
Cox's father Tom played in the NFL for a part of the 1987 season. His older brother Dakota also played college football and spent time in training camp with the Minnesota Vikings.

References

External links
Auburn Tigers bio

1996 births
Living people
American football fullbacks
Auburn Tigers football players
Miami Dolphins players
People from Apopka, Florida
Players of American football from Florida
Sportspeople from Orange County, Florida